Bonnington railway station served the district of Bonnington, Edinburgh, Scotland from 1846 to 1968 on the Edinburgh, Leith and Granton Railway.

History 
The station opened on 10 May 1846 by the Edinburgh, Leith and Granton Railway. It closed on 1 January 1917 but reopened on 1 April 1919 before permanent closure to passengers on 16 June 1947 and closed to goods in July 1968. The station building (as a private residence) still survives.

References

External links 

Disused railway stations in Edinburgh
Railway stations in Great Britain opened in 1846
Railway stations in Great Britain closed in 1917
Railway stations in Great Britain opened in 1919
Railway stations in Great Britain closed in 1947
1846 establishments in Scotland
1968 disestablishments in Scotland
Former North British Railway stations